82 Squadron or 82nd Squadron may refer to:

 No. 82 Squadron RAF a unit of the Royal Air Force
 No. 82 Squadron RAAF, a unit of the Royal Australian Air Force 
 82d Aerial Targets Squadron, a unit of the United States Air Force 
 VFA-82 (Fighter Attack Squadron 82), a unit of the United States Navy

See also
 82nd Division (disambiguation)
 82nd Regiment (disambiguation)